The diatomic molecule tellurium monoxide has been found as a transient species. Previous work that claimed the existence of TeO solid has not been substantiated. The coating on DVDs called tellurium suboxide may be a mixture of tellurium dioxide and tellurium metal.

History 
Tellurium monoxide was first reported in 1883 by E. Divers and M. Shimose. It was supposedly created by the thermal decomposition of tellurium sulfoxide in a vacuum, and was shown to react with hydrogen chloride in a 1913 report. Later work has not substantiated the claim that this was a pure solid compound. By 1984, the company Panasonic was working on an erasable optical disk drive containing "tellurium monoxide" (really a mixture of Te and TeO2).

See also 
 Tellurium dioxide
 Tellurium trioxide
 Lead carbide – originally thought to be a pure compound, but now considered more likely to be a mixture of carbon and lead
 Iodine pentabromide – originally thought to be a pure compound, but now considered to probably be a mixture of iodine monobromide and excess unreacted bromine

References 

Tellurium(II) compounds
Oxides
Interchalcogens
Hypothetical chemical compounds